Nicholas John Spaeth (January 27, 1950 – March 16, 2014) was the 27th Attorney General of North Dakota, serving from 1985–92. He lost the  1992 North Dakota governor's race to Republican Ed Schafer.

Born in Mahnomen, Minnesota, Spaeth grew up in Valley City, Fargo, and Bismarck in North Dakota. He went to college at Stanford University, where he graduated with honors, and won a Rhodes Scholarship to New College, Oxford. After Oxford, he went to Stanford Law School, where he was managing editor of the law review.

After graduation, he clerked for United States Court of Appeals for the Eighth Circuit Judge Myron Bright and then for Supreme Court Justice Byron White.

In the November 1992 election for governor of North Dakota, Spaeth lost to Schafer, 58% to 41%. In 2004, Spaeth joined H&R Block, Inc. in 2004, as a senior vice president and chief legal officer. He resigned in 2007 and joined the Federal Home Loan Bank (FHLB) as executive vice-president, general counsel and chief risk officer.

Death
Spaeth was found dead in his apartment in Fargo, North Dakota on March 16, 2014. He was 64 years old.

See also 
 List of law clerks of the Supreme Court of the United States (Seat 6)

References

|-

1950 births
2014 deaths
Alumni of New College, Oxford
American Rhodes Scholars
H&R Block
Law clerks of the Supreme Court of the United States
North Dakota Attorneys General
North Dakota Democrats
People from Mahnomen County, Minnesota
Stanford Law School alumni